Coleophora granifera is a moth of the family Coleophoridae. It is found in North America, including Ohio, Ontario and Quebec.

The larvae feed on the leaves of Aster shortii and Aster tradescanthi. They create a tubular, bivalved silken case.

References

granifera
Moths described in 1919
Moths of North America